"Vegas Girl" is a song by British singer Conor Maynard from his debut studio album, Contrast. It was released as the album's second single as a digital download on 22 July 2012. The song was written and produced by The Invisible Men with additional production from Parker & James and was also written by Conor Maynard, Dion Wardle and Scott Thomas. It was also viewed on MTV Push.

Music video
A music video to accompany the release of "Vegas Girl" was first released onto YouTube on 24 June 2012 at a total length of three minutes and forty seconds. Filmed in New York, the video was directed by Travis Kopach.

It begins with Maynard meeting a girl who is wearing a T-shirt that reads "Vegas Girl" he takes a picture of her and tweets it asking his followers if they have seen her throughout the videos various females wearing the same T-shirt are shown.

The song also features a sampling of A.R. Rahman’s track ‘Urvasi Urvasi’  from the 1994 hit Tamil movie ‘Kadhalan’.

Critical reception
Robert Copsey of Digital Spy gave the song a positive review stating:

"I'll knock you down like you're Keri/ Forget your name like Rihanna," he insists over slick urban-light beats with a voice that will undoubtedly draw comparisons to Justin Timberlake. The obvious clichés are all present and correct ("Roll the dice, I've got your number/ Hit the jackpot underneath the cover"), but he gets away with it, if only for his homage halfway through to Tequila, Tequila Tequila... .

Track listing

Chart performance

Weekly charts

Year-end charts

Release history

References

2012 singles
Conor Maynard songs
2012 songs
Parlophone singles
Songs written by Jason Pebworth
Songs written by George Astasio
Songs written by Jon Shave